Bank of New Zealand Building may refer to the following buildings in New Zealand:

 Bank of New Zealand Building, Queen Street, Auckland
 Former Bank of New Zealand Building, Princes Street, Dunedin
 Former Bank of New Zealand Building, Hamilton
 Bank of New Zealand Te Aro branch building, Cuba and Manners Streets, Wellington
 Former National Bank of New Zealand Building, Cuba and Vivian Streets, Wellington
 Old Bank Arcade, Lambton Quay, Wellington

Bank of New Zealand Building may also refer to the company's former British headquarters at 1 Queen Victoria Street, London